George Leonard (November 1742 – April 1, 1826) was a Canadian farmer from New Brunswick who served as alderman and chamberlain of Saint John. 

George was born in Plymouth, Massachusetts, the son of Nathaniel Leonard and Priscilla Rogers. He became a merchant in Boston and married Sarah Thatcher there in 1765. During the American Revolutionary War, he was a Loyalist and commanded a fleet of ships which raided coastal towns in 1779. He  took his family to Canada when the British evacuated Boston in 1775. He settled in Parrtown (later Saint John) in 1783. In 1786, he was named superintendent of trade and fisheries at Canso, Nova Scotia. He served as a member of the Council for New Brunswick, serving until his death at Sussex Vale at the age of 83. He was also lieutenant colonel for the Kings County militia and quartermaster for the provincial militia. He founded the Masonic lodge at Saint John.

His son George was a member of the provincial assembly.

External links 
 Biography at the Dictionary of Canadian Biography Online

1742 births
1826 deaths
People from Plymouth, Massachusetts
Saint John, New Brunswick city councillors
Colony of New Brunswick people
United Empire Loyalists
American emigrants to pre-Confederation New Brunswick